The following is the final results of the Iranian Volleyball Super League (Velayat Cup) 2004/05 season.

Regular season

Pool A

Pool B

Playoffs

Quarterfinals

Sanam vs. Saipa

Paykan vs. Azarpayam

Pegah vs. Petrochimi

PAS vs. Bargh Tehran

Semifinals

Sanam vs. Saipa

Pegah vs. Bargh Tehran

Final

Sanam vs. Pegah

Final standings

 Sanam later withdrew from the Asian championship and replaced by Saipa.

References 
 volleyball.ir 

League 2004-05
Iran Super League, 2004-05
Iran Super League, 2004-05
Volleyball League, 2004-05
Volleyball League, 2004-05